An Arabian Knight is a 1920 American drama film directed by Charles Swickard and produced by Sessue Hayakawa's Haworth Pictures Corporation. Its survival status is classified as unknown, which suggests that it is a lost film.

Plot
As described in a film magazine, Cordelia Darwin (Inescourt), spinster sister of Egyptologist George Darwin (Clark) who resides in the desert, is a believer in reincarnation. Certain that she lived two thousand years ago as the Princess Rhodolphis and that youthful dragoman Ahmed (Hayakawa) is the reincarnation of her lost lover, she installs him in her home as a butler. Elinor Wayne (Hall), ward of the Darwins, becomes the prey of Egyptian nobleman Aboul Pasha (Jones). His determination to win her results in her abduction by rascals who take her to the home of the dancer Soada (Pavis). Ahmed follows and rescues Elinor. When murderers hired by Pasha burn down the Darwin home, Ahmed aids the Darwins and Elinor in escaping. Elinor and George are reunited as sweethearts, while Ahmed finds his soul mate in Zorah (Acker).

Cast
Sessue Hayakawa as Ahmed
Lillian Hall as Elinor Wayne
Jean Acker as Zorah
Yvonne Pavis as Soada (credited as Marie Pavis)
Elaine Inescourt as Cordelia Darwin
Harvey Clark as George Darwin (credited as Harvey Clarke)
Fred C. Jones as Aboul Pasha (credited as Fred Jones)
Roy Coulson as Wassef
Tom Bates as Bedr

References

External links

 

1920 films
1920s English-language films
American silent feature films
Haworth Pictures Corporation films
American black-and-white films
American comedy-drama films
1920 comedy-drama films
Films directed by Charles Swickard
Film Booking Offices of America films
1920s American films
Silent comedy-drama films
Silent American drama films
Silent American comedy films
Films with screenplays by Richard Schayer
Films about reincarnation